Virginia Leith (October 15, 1925 – November 4, 2019) was an American film and television actress.

Career
Leith starred in a few films, with her most productive period coming in the 1950s. Her debut was also the first film directed by Stanley Kubrick, a self-financed art house film, Fear and Desire (1953). She signed a contract with 20th Century-Fox in 1954 and had leading roles in films such as Violent Saturday (1955), Toward the Unknown, On the Threshold of Space, and opposite Robert Wagner and Joanne Woodward in the crime drama A Kiss Before Dying (all 1956). Her most recognizable role may have been that of a decapitated woman whose head is kept alive in The Brain That Wouldn't Die (1962, shot 1959).

She left acting after her 1960 marriage to actor Donald Harron. Following her divorce from Harron, in the 1970s Leith resumed her career and appeared mainly in television shows, including Starsky and Hutch, Barnaby Jones, and Baretta. She left the screen again in the early 1980s.

Personal life
She was involved with actor Jeffrey Hunter during his divorce in 1955. She dated actor Marlon Brando in 1956. 

Leith died on November 4, 2019 at the age of 94. Upon her death, her body was donated to medical science at the UCLA Medical School.

Filmography

References

External links

1925 births
2019 deaths
20th-century American actresses
Actresses from Cleveland
American film actresses
American television actresses
20th Century Studios contract players